Life's Too Short may refer to:

Life's Too Short (album), 1991 album by Marshall Crenshaw
Life's Too Short (TV series), a 2011 British sitcom mockumentary
"Life's Too Short" (Disney song), from Disney's Frozen
"Life's Too Short" (Tinashe song), 2019
"Life's Too Short" (Aespa song), 2022
"Life's Too Short" (Six Feet Under episode), 2001

See also
 Life Is Too Short (disambiguation)
 Ars longa, vita brevis, an aphorism roughly meaning "skilfulness takes time and life is short"